The untitled EP, also known as Untitled or Slint, is the only EP and final release by the American rock band Slint. It was recorded in 1989, with the band breaking up in 1990 before Spiderland's release; it remained unreleased until 1994.

Background 
The songs featured on the EP were recorded in the spring of 1989 with Steve Albini, who engineered Slint's first studio album. The album contains a previously unreleased song, "Glenn", and a reinterpretation of the song "Rhoda" from Tweez.

Both songs were intended to be released as a 12" single on Jennifer Hartman Records, the same label that released Tweez, as original copies of that LP included a flyer advertisement for the 12" as an insert; Slint signed to Touch and Go Records before it was sent to press, however, and the master tapes were shelved. In 1994, Touch and Go released the EP in 10" and CD formats.

Reception
Marc Gilman of AllMusic praised the album, describing it as "Slint's most important release" and "a requisite listen for anyone interested in the post-rock era." He also wrote: "Without lyrics, the music takes a precedence that it perhaps lacks on other albums."

Track listing

References

External links 

 Untitled EP at Discogs (list of releases)

1994 EPs
Slint EPs
Touch and Go Records EPs
Albums produced by Steve Albini